Eristalinae (or Milesiinae) are one of the four subfamilies of the fly family Syrphidae, or hoverflies. A well-known species included in this subfamily is the dronefly, Eristalis tenax.

Species in this subfamily are often misclassified as bees instead of flies due to their exceptional Mimicry, especially to resemble Honeybees (family Apidae). The best strategy for proper identification is to look at their eyes and wings and compare with fly morphology, to determine membership of family Syrphidae and/or of order Hymenoptera.

Taxonomy
This subfamily consists of the following tribes:

 Brachyopini	 
 Callicerini
 Cerioidini
 Eristalini
 Sericomyiini
 Eumerini
 Milesiini
 Rhingiini
 Spheginobacchini
 Volucellini

gallery

Ecology

This subfamily has the widest range of larvae habitat of any in Syrphidae. Larvae live in sap trails, under bark, in rot-holes in trees, in decaying organic material such as dung and compost, and in shallow aquatic environments. Most larvae feed on decaying organic debris. They are filter feeders in many kinds of aquatic media. They purify water by filtering microorganisms and other products. Some feed on bulbs and are considered garden pests.

Certain species in Eristalinae live as scavengers and take shelter in the remains of other insects, while others, like Volucella, are Parasitoids and live in wasp or bee nests. Some other species are found to be leaf miners and tunnel inside the stems and roots of plants. Additionally, males of this subfamily typically employ dual mate-seeking strategies to find females, most commonly patrolling blossoms and waiting near potential sites where females could lay eggs.

References

3.  Bugguide.net

4.  Maier, C.T. (1982). Larval habitats and mate-seeking sites of flower flies (Diptera: Syrphidae, Eristalinae). Proceedings of the Entomological Society of Washington, 84, 603–609.

5. Maier, C.T. (1979). Dual Mate-Seeking Strategies in Male Syrphid Flies. Annals of the Entomological Society of America, Volume 72, Issue 1, Pages 54–61.

External links